Margaret Perry was a 26-year-old woman from Portadown, County Armagh, Northern Ireland who was abducted on 21 June 1991. After a tip from the IRA, her body was found buried across the border in a field in Mullaghmore, County Sligo, Ireland, on 30 June 1992. She had been beaten to death. Her murder has never been solved.

Background
Margaret Perry was a civil servant, working at Training and Employment in Lisburn. A Catholic, she lived with her widowed mother, Mary, at Churchill Park, Portadown. She disappeared on 21 June 1991, after she crossed the border into the Republic of Ireland to visit her boyfriend, Gregory Burns, who was hospitalised in Monaghan. A year later, on 30 June 1992, acting on a tip-off from the IRA via a local priest, the Garda found her body not far from Mullaghmore. She had been strangled and beaten to death with a spade, then buried in a shallow grave in a forest not far from the former estate of the late Lord Mountbatten.

Deaths of Burns, Dignam, Starrs
In June 1992, shortly after the recovery of Perry's body, the PIRA admitted responsibility for the killing of three men, whose bodies were found at different roadsides in County Armagh. The IRA claimed the men, all members of the IRA, were undercover agents for MI5 and the RUC Special Branch. The IRA had murdered them, leaving their naked, hooded bodies in ditches. The bodies bore evidence of torture and each had a single bullet wound to the back of the head. They were Gregory Burns (aged 33), John Dignam (aged 32) and Aidan Starrs (aged 29), all natives of Portadown.

The IRA justified the killings by stating they were guilty of the abduction and murder of Perry. They claimed that Burns had had an affair with Perry. The IRA claimed she threatened to expose his group's intelligence links, so the men kidnapped and murdered her. As the bodies might have been booby-trapped, they were left in place overnight.

Allegations by An Phoblacht
It was later claimed, through an article in the Sinn Féin newspaper An Phoblacht, Dignam had been detained by the RUC over Perry's disappearance in the summer of 1991. During interrogation, it was claimed, he confessed to her murder and implicated the other two men as well. The newspaper claimed that instead of arresting the three men, they were recruited as informers for the Force Research Unit, and that the man in charge of their interrogation and executions was Freddie Scappaticci, another FRU agent who had infiltrated the IRA's Internal Security Unit. 

The newspaper also claimed Gregory Burns had been a paid agent of MI5 for the past 13 years, since they recruited him in Enniskillen. It was  alleged he had been an aide to Owen Carron, election worker for Bobby Sands, and that Gregory Burns' had arranged the killing of his own brother, Sean, in 1982, in one of the "shoot-to-kill" controversies of the 1980s. 

It was alleged that Burns had been instrumental in foiling many IRA operations in Northern Ireland. According to the newspaper report, he wanted to break up with Perry, his girlfriend at the time, but was fearful she would reveal that he had told her he was working for British Intelligence. Burns consulted his handlers, who agreed that he, Dignam and Starrs should get out before they were uncovered. But the head of the FRU – Brigadier  Gordon Kerr – refused, telling Burns to clear up his personal mess. Burns replied that if he and his comrades were not pulled out by the FRU, he would certainly have to kill Perry. Burns travelled to Sligo to undergo a minor arm operation in June 1991. On 21 June, Dignam and Starrs drove Perry to Sligo, ostensibly to see Burns, but outside Mullaghmore she was strangled and beaten to death with a spade, burying her in a shallow forest grave. 

The allegations against the three in An Phoblacht were denied by their family and supporters, who believed the three were set up. Burns' father, Jim Burns, stated he did not believe Gregory had anything to do with his own brother's death in 1982. The British newspaper The Guardian reported there were contradictions in the IRA's version of events. 

Investigations into Perry's disappearance by Sunday World reporter Martin O'Hagan prompted IRA interest. Freddie Scappaticci and his unit interrogated Burns, Dignam and Starrs the following year, leading to their deaths. Taped confessions by the three men recorded by Scappaticci were later played to Peter Taylor in his BBC documentary. The IRA gave information to a Sligo priest that led to Perry's body being recovered. Three days later, after nearly two weeks interrogation, the three men were found dumped in County Armagh. All bore evidence of torture. After Dignam's funeral, a letter by him was given to his pregnant wife:I have only a matter of hours to live. I only wish I could see you and the kids one last time, but as you know, this is not possible.

See also
Force Research Unit
Internal Security Unit
List of kidnappings
List of solved missing person cases
John Joe McGee
Joseph Fenton
Murder of Jean McConville
Murder of Thomas Oliver
Murders of Catherine and Gerard Mahon
Stakeknife

References

External links

1990s missing person cases
1991 murders in the Republic of Ireland
Deaths by beating in the United Kingdom
Formerly missing people
Missing person cases in Ireland
Female murder victims
County Armagh